Øversjødalen is a village in Tolga Municipality in Innlandet county, Norway. It is located at the northern end of the lake Langsjøen. The village of Hodalen lies about half-way between Øversjødalen and Tolga. Øversjødalen lies along County Road 26 which runs between the villages of Tolga and Drevsjø.

The Holøydalen Church is located on the west side of the village.

References

Tolga, Norway
Villages in Innlandet